Malou (born 1984 in Copenhagen) is a Danish former softcore porn actress and she also appeared in fetish pictures. She first got noticed in 2003 and in 2004 she became the front page girl for the magazine Eurotic. In 2005 she moved to the United States to work as a promo girl for sex products made by the company Black Video Media. Malou today resided in Copenhagen Denmark again.

References

1984 births
Danish female adult models
Living people